

Events
 The poet Philippe de Rémi becomes the bailli for the county of Beauvais

Births

Deaths

13th-century poetry
Poetry